Nicola Pederzolli (born 11 March 1974) is an Austrian snowboarder, born in Innsbruck. She competed in women's halfpipe at the 1998 Winter Olympics in Nagano, and in women's halfpipe at the 2002 Winter Olympics in Salt Lake City.

References

External links

1974 births
Living people
Sportspeople from Innsbruck
Austrian female snowboarders
Olympic snowboarders of Austria
Snowboarders at the 1998 Winter Olympics
Snowboarders at the 2002 Winter Olympics